Stroniewice  is a village in the administrative district of Gmina Domaniewice, within Łowicz County, Łódź Voivodeship, in central Poland. The village still keep the traditional customs. We can see it now as a folklore skansen that in social tradition has not changed since The Second Word. 

The village has a population of 300.

References

Stroniewice